Brauneck is a mountain in Bavaria, Germany. It is the 'house mountain' of Lenggries.

The mountain is a popular local skiing destination.

Mountains of Bavaria
Bavarian Prealps
One-thousanders of Germany
Mountains of the Alps